Ancylistes bicuspis is a species of beetle in the family Cerambycidae. It was described by Chevrolat in 1857.

References

Ancylistes
Beetles described in 1857